is a Japanese actress, tarento  and voice actress. She is represented by the Smile Monkey company.

Fūka Haruna is most known by her nickname Harukaze-chan. As of October 2012, she had 141,500 followers on Twitter, where she gets a lot of feedback and has been a target of Internet bullying. Due to the online disclosure of her personal information, she had to move houses and change schools.

On April 5, 2013, she entered junior high school. As of June 2013, she has 160,000 followers on Twitter.

Filmography

TV dramas 
  Ep. 2 (NHK BShi, April 9, 2007)
  Ep. 2, 8, 11 (TVK, 2010)
  Ep. 3 (Fuji TV, January 25, 2011)
  (NTV, 2011)
  (NHK, November 2011)
  (NTV, October–December 2012)
  (TV Tokyo, December 21, 2012)

Anime television 
  (MBS, July 5, 2012) as Liu Ing
  (BS Fuji, October 2012)
 Omakase! Miracle Cat-dan (NHK Educational TV, March 2015) as Pokomi Akagawa

Theatrical anime 
  (January 2012)
  (July 2012)
  (September 2015)

Movies 
  (2004)
  (September 2006)
  (September 2009)

CD dramas 
  (January 2013)

Dubbing

Live-action 
 Along with the Gods: The Last 49 Days, Lee Deok-choon (Kim Hyang-gi)
 Annabelle: Creation, Kate (Tayler Buck)
 The Bodyguard, Cherry Li (Jacqueline Chan)
 The Hunt, Yoga Pants (Emma Roberts)
 Pacific Rim: Uprising, Cadet Renata (Shyrley Rodriguez)
 A Series of Unfortunate Events as Isadora Quagmire (Avi Lake)
 Vanishing Time: A Boy Who Returned, Soo-rin (Shin Eun-soo)

Animation 
 Maya the Bee, Maya
 Maya the Bee: The Honey Games, Maya

Bibliography 
  (Ohta Publishing, August 2011)

References

External links 
  
 Official agency profile 
 
 

2001 births
Living people
Actresses from Yokohama
Japanese child actresses
Japanese film actresses
Japanese television actresses
Japanese voice actresses